MI-12 can refer to:
Mil Mi-12, Soviet helicopter

M-12 (Michigan highway)
MI12, British Military Intelligence Section 12